The Graduate Institute of Ferrous Technology (GIFT POSTECH) is an institute for graduate-level education and research in the field of iron and steel technology at Pohang University of Science and Technology, South Korea. It has nine specialized laboratories covering all sides of metallurgy.

History

POSCO, one of the world's biggest steel production companies, in 1986, initiated a founding of a science and technology university in the city of Pohang, about 200 miles southeast of Seoul, the capital city of Korea. Pohang University of Science and Technology (POSTECH) has now become one of the top research universities in Asia. GIFT was founded to provide an academic environment for education and research on ferrous materials.

Structure
The Graduate Institute of Ferrous Technology has nine laboratories with key areas of expertise:
 Alternative Technology Lab:
Continuous casting-related innovation
Texture control
Alternative alloying and processing
 Control and Automation Lab:
Computer control system
Process automation
Control theory & Applications
Measurement
 Clean Steel Lab:
Thermochemistry
Physico-chemical properties
Fluid dynamics
Solidification and casting
 Environmental Metallurgy Lab:
Reduction of CO2 emission
Improvement of energy efficiency
Gas alloying technology
 Computational Metallurgy Lab:
Classical modeling and experiments
Phase field modeling and experiments
First principle calculation, quantum mechanical modeling
 Microstructure Control Lab:
Phase transformation / electron microscopy
Microscopic deformation behavior
Toughness enhancement via microstructure control
Innovative processing (e.g., twin-roll casting)
 Materials Design Lab:
Automotive Steels, Galvanized/Galvannealed Products
Electrical Steels
Stainless steels
Steel grades related to power generation
 Materials Mechanics Lab:
Net Shape Forming (sheet forming, other forming)
Performance in service (fracture, crashworthiness, fatigue)
 Surface Engineering Lab:
Composite coatings
 Corrosion mechanism & lifetime prediction
Corrosion resistant alloy design
Metallic coatings

People
Among the faculty members who have worked at the Graduate Institute of Ferrous Technology, several Professors are distinguished world-widely:
 Sir Professor  Harshad_Bhadeshia 
 Professor Frédéric Barlat
 Professor Nack Joon KIM
 Professor Bruno De Cooman
 Prof. Yasushi Sasaki
 Prof. Hae-Geon Lee
 Prof. Chong Soo Lee

References

Educational institutions established in 1993
Research institutes in South Korea
Pohang University of Science and Technology
Metallurgical organizations
1993 establishments in South Korea